A pileup can refer to:
 Multiple-vehicle collision
 In nuclear and particle physics, a situation where a particle detector is affected by several events at the same time.
 In ham radio, particularly in DXing slang, the presence of many ham operators trying to communicate with a distant entity, all in the same time.
 Pile Up, an album by queercore band Pansy Division
 Pileup format, a file format used in the field of Bioinformatics